The Dongfeng Fengguang 370 is a compact MPV produced by Chinese automaker Dongfeng-Xiaokang (Sokon), a subsidiary of Dongfeng Motor Co., Ltd.

Overview

The Fengguang 370 debuted in November 2015 and was launched on the Chinese car market in April 2016. The Dongfeng Fengguang 370 shares its underpinnings with the Dongfeng Fengguang 360 MPV and seats seven in a 2-3-2 configuration with prices starting from 49,900 yuan to 67,900 yuan.

The Fengguang 370 is powered by a 1.5 liter four-cylinder petrol engine developing 116 hp and 148 nm, mated to a five-speed manual transmission.

References

External links

Fengguang 370 website

Compact MPVs
Cars introduced in 2016
Rear-wheel-drive vehicles
2010s cars
Minivans
Cars of China
Vehicles with CVT transmission